Stara Wieś Druga  is a village in the administrative district of Gmina Bychawa, within Lublin County, Lublin Voivodeship, in eastern Poland.

The village has a population of 239.

References

bychawa is a larger village

Villages in Lublin County